William Watson (29 May 1916 – 1986) was an English footballer who played as a full back for Lincoln City, Chesterfield and Rochdale.

He was the younger brother of Arthur Watson, who also played for Lincoln City and Chesterfield.

References

1916 births
1986 deaths
Lincoln City F.C. players
Chesterfield F.C. players
Rochdale A.F.C. players
Footballers from Wakefield
English footballers
Association football fullbacks